Heinz Marchel (9 June 1967) is an Austrian former cyclist. He won the Austrian National Road Race Championships in 1996.

References

External links
 

1967 births
Living people
Austrian male cyclists
Place of birth missing (living people)